Violaine Aubrée (born on October 12, 1979) is an international French rugby union player, 

She was a member of the France women's national rugby union team. She debuted with the French team, on 13 March 2005. She competed at the 2006 Women's Rugby World Cup.

She played second line or third line with the Stade Rennais rugby club.

She exercises the profession of professor of physical education..

References 

1979 births
French rugby union players
Living people